The 2017–18 Missouri Tigers women's basketball team represents the University of Missouri in the 2017–18 NCAA Division I women's basketball season. The Tigers were led by eighth year head coach Robin Pingeton. They play their games at Mizzou Arena and were members of the Southeastern Conference. They began the season ranked #16 in both the AP and Coaches Polls. They finished the season 24–8, 11–5 in SEC play to finish in a 4-way tie for fourth place. They advanced to the quarterfinals of the SEC women's tournament where they lost to Georgia. They received an at-large to the NCAA women's tournament where they got upset by Florida Gulf Coast in the first round.

Last season
They finished the 2016–17 season at 22–11, 11–5 in SEC play to tie for fourth place in the conference. They lost in the quarterfinals of the SEC women's tournament to Texas A&M. They received an at-large to the NCAA women's tournament where they defeated South Florida in the first round before losing to Florida State in the second round.

Roster

Schedule and results

|-
!colspan=12 style="background:black; color:white;"| Exhibition

|-
!colspan=12 style="background:black; color:white;"| Non-conference regular season

|-
!colspan=12 style="background:black; color:white;"| SEC regular season

|-
!colspan=12 style="background:black; color:white;"| SEC Women's Tournament

|-
!colspan=12 style="background:black; color:white;"| NCAA Women's Tournament

Rankings

^Coaches' Poll did not release a second poll at the same time as the AP.

See also
2017–18 Missouri Tigers men's basketball team

References

Missouri Tigers women's basketball seasons
Missouri
Missouri
Missouri, basketball women
Missouri, basketball women